Lex Peterson (14 September 1957 – 31 August 2004) was a New Zealand bobsledder. He competed in the two man and the four man events at the 1988 Winter Olympics.

References

External links
 

1957 births
2004 deaths
New Zealand male bobsledders
Olympic bobsledders of New Zealand
Bobsledders at the 1988 Winter Olympics
Sportspeople from Palmerston North